The 2015 Madrid City Council election, also the 2015 Madrid municipal election, was held on Sunday, 24 May 2015, to elect the 10th City Council of the municipality of Madrid. All 57 seats in the City Council were up for election. The election was held simultaneously with regional elections in thirteen autonomous communities and local elections all throughout Spain.

Leading the People's Party (PP) local list was Esperanza Aguirre, former president of the Community of Madrid (2003–2012), president of the Senate of Spain (1999–2002) and minister of Education and Culture (1996–1999), as well as the leader of the regional PP branch since 2004. Mayor Ana Botella, who succeeded Alberto Ruiz-Gallardón early into his term in December 2011, had declined re-election in September 2014. The election was an unexpectedly close race between Aguirre's PP and former judge Manuela Carmena's Podemos-supported Ahora Madrid platform. The collapse in the PP vote and the loss of its absolute majority allowed Carmena to gain power through an alliance with the Spanish Socialist Workers' Party (PSOE), resulting in the first left-wing government in the city since 1989.

The PSOE suffered heavily from tactical voting to Ahora Madrid after it became apparent throughout the campaign that the left-of-centre vote was coalescing around Carmena's coalition. The newcomer liberal Citizens party also entered the City Council for the first time, collecting votes disenchanted with the PP and replacing Union, Progress and Democracy (UPyD) as the main centrist local force. United Left (IU) fell below the 5% threshold and failed to gain any representation for the first time in history.

Electoral system
The City Council of Madrid was the top-tier administrative and governing body of the municipality of Madrid, composed of the mayor, the government council and the elected plenary assembly. Elections to the local councils in Spain were fixed for the fourth Sunday of May every four years.

Voting for the local assembly was on the basis of universal suffrage, which comprised all nationals over 18 years of age, registered and residing in the municipality of Madrid and in full enjoyment of their political rights, as well as resident non-national European citizens and those whose country of origin allowed Spanish nationals to vote in their own elections by virtue of a treaty. Local councillors were elected using the D'Hondt method and a closed list proportional representation, with an electoral threshold of five percent of valid votes—which included blank ballots—being applied in each local council. Councillors were allocated to municipal councils based on the following scale:

The mayor was indirectly elected by the plenary assembly. A legal clause required that mayoral candidates earned the vote of an absolute majority of councillors, or else the candidate of the most-voted party in the assembly was to be automatically appointed to the post. In the event of a tie, the appointee would be determined by lot.

The electoral law allowed for parties and federations registered in the interior ministry, coalitions and groupings of electors to present lists of candidates. Parties and federations intending to form a coalition ahead of an election were required to inform the relevant Electoral Commission within ten days of the election call, whereas groupings of electors needed to secure the signature of a determined amount of the electors registered in the municipality for which they were seeking election, disallowing electors from signing for more than one list of candidates. For the case of Madrid, as its population was over 1,000,001, at least 8,000 signatures were required.

Mayoral candidates

According to the Spanish legislation on local authorities, the government of cities is assigned to the City Council and the mayor. The Spanish political system is parliamentary democracy in all its levels of government, with the city council responsible for the election of the mayor.

People's Party (PP): The Mayor of Madrid, Ana Botella, announced her intention not to run for mayor in September 2014. Mariano Rajoy, the President of the PP, designated Esperanza Aguirre as candidate on 6 March 2015.
Spanish Socialist Workers' Party (PSOE): The Spanish Socialist Workers' Party scheduled a primary election in October 2014. Regional assemblyman and frequent talk show guest Antonio Miguel Carmona and city councillor Enrique del Olmo announced their intention to run for the post. Candidates intending to run had to secure the endorsement of at least 20% of the party membership. On the closing day of the endorsement collection only Carmona had gathered the required endorsements, thus being nominated as party candidate without the primary election being held.
United Left (IU):United left of Madrid held an open primary election on 30 November 2014. The election was contested by:
Mauricio Valiente, assemblyman, representing the minority sectors in the last IU Regional Assembly
Raquel López, city councillor, representing the majority sectors.
Eulalia Vaquero, assembly woman, representing sectors disengaged from the majority.
Valiente defeated his rivals by securing 59% of the votes. However, he withdrew his candidacy after internal turmoil in the regional branch of the party and entered the Ahora Madrid election list, led by Manuela Carmena. Raquel López was designated as the new IU candidate for the local election instead.

Union, Progress and Democracy (UPyD): The party's current spokesperson on the City Council, David Ortega, obtained a landslide victory (81% of the votes) against three largely unknown candidates.

Campaign
Electoral debates were held in Telemadrid between the candidates of the PP, PSOE, IU, UPyD, Vox, Citizens and Ahora Madrid in the last week of campaign, between 18 and 20 May. The most expected and tense moment came with the debate between PP candidate Esperanza Aguirre and AM Manuela Carmena, as the most-likely candidates to become the next Mayor of the city. Aguirre immediately accused Carmena of saying in the past that "ETA members had suffered a lot", trying to link the former judge with the terrorist group, as well as trying to discredit Carmena's career in the judiciary, which was seen as a furious attack of Aguirre on Carmena. The latter, visibly surprised, counterattacked responding that Aguirre was acting arrogantly and contemptuous to others and accusing her of allowing corruption to spread during her tenure as President of Madrid. "Please go, you've caused a lot of harm" said Carmena to Aguirre.

In the last days of the campaign, especially following her debate with Aguirre, several celebrities such as actors Pilar Bardem, Carlos Bardem, Loles León, Goya Toledo, Paco León, playwright Cristina Rota, lawyer and former politician Cristina Almeida and journalist Ernesto Ekaizer expressed their support for Carmena's candidacy, with actress Eva Hache going on to say through the Twitter social network that "I don't know if we are Manuela but surely we are not the other [in reference to Aguirre]. VOTE." Carmena had also received the support of dozens of artists who created drawings in support of Carmena's and Ahora Madrid candidacy, with the drawings themselves becoming viral in the social networks. Following the Telemadrid debate, after which Aguirre was highly criticised for her aggressive behaviour towards Carmena, supporters cast the drawings next to Aguirre's home in Malasaña. On 21 May, a Carmena's act in the center of Madrid exceeded its capacity, originally scheduled for 800 people, resulting in the closing of a street and in Carmena herself apologizing to the around 1,500 people outside that were not able to enter.

Opinion polls
The table below lists voting intention estimates in reverse chronological order, showing the most recent first and using the dates when the survey fieldwork was done, as opposed to the date of publication. Where the fieldwork dates are unknown, the date of publication is given instead. The highest percentage figure in each polling survey is displayed with its background shaded in the leading party's colour. If a tie ensues, this is applied to the figures with the highest percentages. The "Lead" column on the right shows the percentage-point difference between the parties with the highest percentages in a poll. When available, seat projections determined by the polling organisations are displayed below (or in place of) the percentages in a smaller font; 29 seats were required for an absolute majority in the City Council of Madrid.

Results

Notes

References
Opinion poll sources

Other

Madrid
Elections in Madrid
2015 in Madrid